Monastyrshchina is the name of several inhabited localities in Russia.

Urban localities
Monastyrshchina, Monastyrshchinsky District, Smolensk Oblast, a settlement under the administrative jurisdiction of  Monastyrshchinskoye Urban Settlement in Monastyrshchinsky District of Smolensk Oblast

Rural localities
Monastyrshchina, Orichevsky District, Kirov Oblast, a selo in Pustoshinsky Rural Okrug of Orichevsky District of Kirov Oblast
Monastyrshchina, Orlovsky District, Kirov Oblast, a village in Podgorodny Rural Okrug of Orlovsky District of Kirov Oblast
Monastyrshchina, Safonovsky District, Smolensk Oblast, a village in Prudkovskoye Rural Settlement of Safonovsky District of Smolensk Oblast
Monastyrshchina, Voronezh Oblast, a selo in Monastyrshchinskoye Rural Settlement of Bogucharsky District of Voronezh Oblast